Hironobu Kaneko (5 June 1898 – 17 August 1988) was a Japanese painter. His work was part of the painting event in the art competition at the 1936 Summer Olympics.

References

1898 births
1988 deaths
20th-century Japanese painters
Japanese painters
Olympic competitors in art competitions
People from Kurume